Who I Am is the first EP from Blanca. Word Records released the project on January 13, 2015.

Reception

Specifying in a four star out of five review by CCM Magazine, Andy Argyrakis observed, "Blanca makes a series of bold solo statements on this beat-driven diary". In agreement with it being considered a four star album from New Release Tuesday, Caitlin Lassiter recognizes, "it's obvious that Blanca is a seasoned artist." Micah Garnett, awarding the album three stars for 365 Days of Inspiring Media, writes, "Who I Am is an EP I might hand to my little sister, but I wouldn’t listen to myself."

Tracks

Charts

References

2015 EPs
Blanca (musician) albums
Word Records EPs